Qarah Tappeh (also Romanized as Qareh Tapeh and Qareh Tappeh; also known as Ghareh Tappeh, Kara Tepe, and Qar Tepe) is a village in Chaybasar-e Jonubi Rural District, in the Central District of Maku County, West Azerbaijan Province, Iran. At the 2006 census, its population was 874, in 218 families.

References 

Populated places in Maku County